Hell on Devil's Island is a 1957 American adventure film directed by Christian Nyby and written by Steven Ritch. The film stars Helmut Dantine, William Talman, Donna Martell, Jean Willes, Rex Ingram and Robert Cornthwaite. The film was released in August 1957, by 20th Century Fox.

Plot
In the French Guinea prison known as Devil's Island, the ruthless commandant Bayard savagely beats Paul Rigaud and other convicts. The island's new governor, Renault, is determined to put an end to such brutality.

Efforts by the evil Bayard and his seductive accomplice Suzanne, a cafe owner, fail to keep Rigaud confined and he is released. He meets up with former cellmate Lulu and is approached by Governor Renault, who has discovered Rigaud was a newspaper editor who was imprisoned unjustly for his published opinions. Renault requests that Rigaud help him expose the prison's cruel punishments, with help from the governor's daughter, Giselle.

Suzanne agrees to betray Bayard, only to be stabbed to death by a bartender loyal to the commandant. Justice is ultimately done, however, after which Rigaud and Lulu begin personally tearing down the barriers of the prison.

Cast 
Helmut Dantine as Paul Rigaud
William Talman as Bayard
Donna Martell as Giselle Renault
Jean Willes as Suzanne
Rex Ingram as Lulu
Robert Cornthwaite as Gov. Renault
Jay Adler as Toto
Peter Adams as Jacques Boucher
Edward Colmans as Jean Robert
Mel Welles as Felix Molyneaux
Charles Bohbot as Marcel

Producer
Filming started in March 1957.

References

External links 
 

1957 films
1957 adventure films
1957 crime drama films
20th Century Fox films
American adventure films
American black-and-white films
American crime drama films
Films directed by Christian Nyby
Films set on Devil's Island
1950s English-language films
1950s American films